Blaž Kavčič and Blaž Rola were the defending champions but chose not to defend their title.

Zdeněk Kolář and Andrea Vavassori won the title after defeating Franco Agamenone and Manuel Guinard 3–6, 7–6(9–7), [10–6] in the final.

Seeds

Draw

References

External links
 Main draw

Zadar Open - Doubles